is a Japanese professional baseball infielder.  He was born on April 28, 1987 in Sendai. Miyagi.  He is currently playing for Yokohama DeNA BayStars of the NPB.

References

1987 births
Living people
Baseball people from Sendai
Japanese baseball players
Nippon Professional Baseball infielders
Hokkaido Nippon-Ham Fighters players
Yokohama DeNA BayStars players